Derek Wiggan (born July 27, 1992) is a professional Canadian football defensive lineman for the Calgary Stampeders of the Canadian Football League (CFL).

Early career 

From 2006 to 2009, Wiggan played high school football for St. Michael's College School. In 2008, he was a part of the championship team that won the Metro Bowl. He also participated in shot put events with the track and field team from 2008 to 2010.

Wiggan played college football for the Queen's Golden Gaels from 2010 to 2014 as a defensive end. In 2013, he made 28 tackles, 5.5 sacks, and forced two fumbles to become a first-team OUA all-star. He recorded 36 tackles, 5.5 sacks, and recovered four fumbles the next year. Wiggan was named a second-team OUA all-star in 2014.

Professional career 

Wiggan was selected by the Calgary Stampeders in the fourth round of the 2014 CFL Draft with the 34th overall pick after being ranked as high as 14th by the CFL Scouting Bureau in January of that year. He was signed on May 27, 2014. After attending training camp with the Stampeders, Wiggan returned to Queen's University for his final year before re-signing with the team on February 18. 2015. He transitioned from a defensive end into the role of defensive tackle for his first season. He made his CFL debut in the first week game against the Hamilton Tiger-Cats. In his first three seasons in Calgary, Wiggan played in 46 games accumulating 44 defensive tackles, seven sacks, four special teams tackles and one forced fumble. Following the 2017 season Wiggan and the Stamps agreed to a two-year contract extension.

References

External links
 Calgary Stampeders bio

1992 births
Living people
Canadian football defensive linemen
Calgary Stampeders players
Queen's Golden Gaels football players
University of St. Michael's College alumni
Players of Canadian football from Ontario
Canadian football people from Toronto